Peintre Celebre (17 March 1994 – 19 October 2018) was an American-bred, French-trained champion thoroughbred racehorse. He won the French Derby and the Prix de l'Arc de Triomphe in 1997.

Background
Peintre Celebre was bred and owned by Daniel Wildenstein (1917–2001), the French art dealer and horseman. Peintre Celebre came from a line of outstanding thoroughbreds. He was a son of Nureyev, France's champion miler in 1980, who was in turn the son of the great Northern Dancer. He was trained by André Fabre.

Racing career
Peintre Celebre was lightly raced as a two-year-old, entering only two races, winning one and finishing third in the other.

In 1997, at age three, the horse won the French Derby and the Grand Prix de Paris before facing the best horses in Europe in France's most prestigious race, the Prix de l'Arc de Triomphe. Ridden by jockey Olivier Peslier, Peintre Celebre ran away from the field, winning the 1½ mile race by five lengths and breaking the track speed record by 3.4 seconds. His victory made him only the second horse after Le Pacha in 1941 to complete that treble.

Peintre Celebre raced five times that year, winning four starts and finishing second by a neck in a race where he was boxed in. He was named European Horse of the Year, and the International Classification rated him the best in the world that year.

Stud career
Before the 1998 racing season, Peintre Celebre suffered a career-ending injury and was retired to breeding at Coolmore Stud in Fethard, County Tipperary, Ireland and Shuttled to Australia in 1998-2003, and in Japan for one Season in 2001. His offspring include Pride, Byword and Collection (Hong Kong Derby).Pensioned from stud duties in 2014 and died on 19 October 2018.

Pedigree

References

External links
 Video of Peintre Celebre's impressive win in the 1997 Prix du Jockey Club at YouTube.com
 Peintre Celebre's pedigree and partial racing stats

1994 racehorse births
2018 racehorse deaths
Racehorses bred in Kentucky
Racehorses trained in France
Arc winners
European Thoroughbred Horse of the Year
Cartier Award winners
Thoroughbred family 9